Luan Zylfo (11 September 1954 – 13 May 2000) was an Albanian professional football referee. He was shot and killed on 13 May 2000 at a Kafenë near the Selman Stërmasi Stadium, where he had earlier officiated a match between Partizani and Tomori. He was sitting Tomori's president Adrian Çobo, assistant referee Shpëtim Lamçe, fourth official Albano Janku, commentator Dritan Shakohoxha and the driver of the Albanian Football Association Agim Veshi. Gunmen opened fire on the group, killing both Zylfo and Çobo. Shortly after his death the national Referee Collegium in Tirana was named after Zylfo.

References

Albanian football referees
1954 births
2000 deaths
Place of birth missing
People murdered in Albania
Albanian murder victims